Garvan Point (‘Nos Garvan’ \'nos 'gar-van\) is the point forming the east side of the entrance to Retizhe Cove on the south coast of Trinity Peninsula in Graham Land, Antarctica.

The point is named after the settlements of Garvan in Northern and Northeastern Bulgaria.

Location
German-British mapping in 1996.

Maps
 Trinity Peninsula. Scale 1:250000 topographic map No. 5697. Institut für Angewandte Geodäsie and British Antarctic Survey, 1996.
 Antarctic Digital Database (ADD). Scale 1:250000 topographic map of Antarctica. Scientific Committee on Antarctic Research (SCAR). Since 1993, regularly updated.

References
 Garvan Point. SCAR Composite Antarctic Gazetteer
 Bulgarian Antarctic Gazetteer. Antarctic Place-names Commission. (details in Bulgarian, basic data in English)

External links
 Garvan Point. Copernix satellite image

Headlands of Trinity Peninsula
Bulgaria and the Antarctic